Árni Magnússon (born 4 June 1965) is an Icelandic politician and former minister for social affairs from May 2003 to March 2006.

External links 
 Non auto-biography of Árni Magnússon on the parliament website

1965 births
Living people
Arni Magnusson
Arni Magnusson